Banpynkhrawnam Nongkhlaw (born 21 September 1997), is an Indian footballer who plays as a defender for Mumbai Kenkre in the I-League.

Career
Nongkhlaw made his professional debut in India, playing for Churchill Brothers in the I-League against Minerva Punjab. He came on as a substitute in the 51st minute.

Career statistics

Club

References

1997 births
Living people
Footballers from Meghalaya
Indian footballers
Churchill Brothers FC Goa players
I-League players
Association football defenders